Pseudoxenetus is a genus of plant bugs in the family Miridae. It is monotypic, having only one described species, Pseudoxenetus regalis.

References

Further reading

 
 
 

Miridae genera
Articles created by Qbugbot
Orthotylini